Iranian Women's Futsal Premier League 2021 The 17th season of the Women's Futsal Premier League is the highest level of the Iranian Women's Futsal Premier League, which started with the presence of 14 teams on November 28, 2021, by the decision of the board members. The new season of the Women's Futsal Premier League will be carried out with the new instructions by the managers of the Futsal League organization.

In fact, with the new instructions, an important step is to be taken towards the professionalization of the Women's Futsal Premier League matches, and for the next season of the matches in 2022, the Super League matches are planned.

According to the new instructions, the 17th season of the Women's Futsal Premier League will begin with 16 teams in two groups of 8 teams. Then, 4 teams from each group will go to the playoff stage, and in the playoff stage, after the competition of 8 teams, the task of the four teams present in the semi-final stage will be determined.

It is worth mentioning that in this way, the 8 teams that will advance from the preliminary stage will be the teams that form the Iranian Women's Futsal Super League 2022.

On the day of the draw, 16 teams participated in the draw, but with the cancellation of Namino Isfahan and Saipa Tehran, the number of teams in the league reached 14.

Survival playoffs 
According to the new instructions, the number of teams in the Premier League should have reached 16, of which 12 teams are ready to participate in the new league from last season, 2 teams have advanced from League One, and Farhan Mallard's team has one point. Under these circumstances, the Futsal League Organization decided to hold a play-off match to select the 16th team to participate in the new season. The match between the two teams of Shahrvand Sari and Heyat Football Isfahan, which were at the bottom of the Premier League groups last season.

This game was held on August 29, 2021, in Ghayanouri Hall of Tehran, and finally the Heyat Football Isfahan team managed to cross the Shahrvand Sari barrier with a result of 4:3 and become the 16th team of the new season of the Women's Futsal Premier League.

Peykan enters the field of team building 
After speculations about the possible entry of several active clubs in the Persian Gulf Pro League, this news was finally realized with the presence of Peykan Tehran in the new season of the Women's Futsal Premier League. Peykan acquired the license to participate in the new season of the Women's Futsal Premier League by purchasing Rahiab Gostar Tehran.

Withdrawal of two teams 
The teams of Namino Isfahan and Saipa Tehran, due to financial problems and the unwillingness of the managers of this club to participate in women's futsal, despite their names being included in the Premier League draw, sent their resignation letter to the league organization. The contenders of the previous seasons of the Women's Futsal Premier League are considered to be the big absentees of the 17th league with their resignation.

Participating teams 
The draw ceremony of the 17th Iranian Women's Futsal Premier League was held on Tuesday, August 31, 2021, in the presence of Hassan Kamranifar, Secretary General of the Football Federation, and Seyedeh Shohreh Mousavi, Vice President of the Women's Football Federation. The 16 participating teams were divided into two groups of 8 teams:

It is worth mentioning that the names of Namino Isfahan and Saipa Tehran teams have been removed from the table due to canceling their participation in the competitions.

Preliminary stage competitions 
After two interruptions in the beginning of the Women's Futsal Premier League competitions, finally, the first week of these competitions was held on October 29, 2021, with 6 matches.

The first half of the season

First week

Second week

Third week

Forth week

Fifth week

Sixth week

Seventh week

The second half of the season

Eighth week

Ninth week

Tenth week

Eleventh week

Twelfth week

Thirteenth week

Fourteenth week

Preliminary stage table 

Rules for classification:

1) Points; 2) Head-to-head points; 3) Goal difference; 4) Goals scored 5) Fair play points

(Note: Head-to-head record is used only after all the matches between the teams in question have been played).

Considerations:

 The top 4 teams of the first group and the top 4 teams of the second group qualified for the Iranian Women's Futsal Super League 2022.
 Teams 5 to 7 in the first group and the second group will participate in the Iranian Women's Futsal Premier League 2022.

Quarter-finals 
According to the instructions of the Women's Futsal Premier League competitions, the top 4 teams in each group will advance to the quarterfinals and then compete in the elimination games in the form of crosses. Palayesh Naft Abadan, Peykan Tehran and Nasr Fardis Karaj had an early advance to the quarterfinals five weeks before the end of the preliminary stage.One week before the end of the group stage competitions, the tasks of the other five teams that advanced to the elimination stage were determined so that the quarter-final stage table could be arranged with the presence of the top 8 teams in the group stage.

1st leg 
The quarter-final stage of the Iranian Women's Futsal Premier League was followed by the completion of two preparatory matches of the Iranian women's national futsal team against the Russian women's national futsal team, and four matches were held simultaneously on March 4.

2nd leg 
The case of the quarter-final stage of the return round of the Iranian Women's Futsal Premier League was closed on March 11 with 4 matches.

Semi-finals 
The teams Mes Rafsanjan, Meli Hafari Ahvaz, Peykan Tehran and Nasr Fardis Karaj in total, the results of the quarter-final stage were able to obtain a permit to participate in the semi-final stage. The schedule of the semi-final stage was determined according to the competition instructions.

1st leg 
With the planning of the league organization before Nowruz 1401, the first round of the semi-final stage was held, in which the teams of Nasr Fardis Karaj and Peykan Tehran were able to win at the rivals' house.

2nd leg 
With the beginning of the new year, the Women's Futsal League competitions resumed and the return matches were held. Finally, the Nasr Fardis Karaj and Peykan Tehran teams were able to reach the final by defeating Meli Hafari Ahvaz and Mes Rafsanjan.

Final 
By holding the semi-final matches, the task of the third joint team and the two teams that made it to the finals of the tournament was determined. The teams of Meli Hafari Ahvaz and Mes Rafsanjan jointly won the third title of this competition, and the teams of Nasr Fardis Karaj and Peykan Tehran were able to obtain a license to participate in the final competitions.

1st leg 
Due to the milder victory of Peykan Tehran compared to Nasr Fardis Karaj in the semi-finals, Peykan hosted the final round match and this match was hosted by Al-Ghadir Hall on April 8, and at the end of an interesting and close match, the two teams They agreed to a draw.

2nd leg 
The last match of the 17th season of the Women's Futsal Premier League was held on the evening of April 17 at the Sarhadabad Hall in Karaj, and the Peykan Tehran women's futsal team won the league title by presenting an offensive performance.

Top scorers 
Maral Torkaman, a young and 19-year-old phenomenon of Iranian women's futsal, was able to score 19 goals with the uniform of Nasr Fardis Karaj women's futsal team and became the top female goal scorer of the 17th season of the Iranian Women's Futsal Premier League.

References 

Women's futsal in Iran
Iranian Women's Futsal Premier League
Futsal leagues in Iran
Futsal in Iran
Futsal leagues in Iran by season